{{speciesbox
| image =Buff-vented Bulbul (Iole olivacea).jpg
| image_caption = Panti Forest, Johor, Malaysia
| status = NT
| status_system = IUCN3.1
| status_ref = 
| genus = Iole
| species = crypta
| authority = Oberholser, 1918
| range_map = 
| synonyms = * Hypsipetes charlottae
 Hypsipetes olivacea Iole charlottae Iole olivacea Microscelis charlottae}}

The buff-vented bulbul (Iole crypta) is a species of songbird in the bulbul family, Pycnonotidae.
It is found in south-eastern Myanmar, south-western Thailand, on the Malay Peninsula, Sumatra and nearby islands.
Its natural habitat is subtropical or tropical moist lowland forests.
It is threatened by habitat loss.

Taxonomy and systematics
The former scientific name, Iole olivacea Blyth, 1844, has now been ruled as permanently invalid by the IOC. Some authorities have classified the buff-vented bulbul in the genera Hypsipetes and Microscelis''. Formerly, Charlotte's bulbul was considered as conspecific with the buff-vented bulbul until split by the IOC in 2017. Alternate names for the buff-vented bulbul include the crested olive bulbul, dull-brown bulbul and Finsch's olive bulbul.

References

buff-vented bulbul
Birds of Malesia
buff-vented bulbul
buff-vented bulbul
Taxonomy articles created by Polbot
Taxobox binomials not recognized by IUCN